The Cypriot Cup is the national knockout football tournament in Cyprus.

Cypriot Cup may also refer to:
 Cyprus Cup - a women's international football tournament in Cyprus.
 Cypriot Cup for lower divisions - a domestic cup for the teams who participate in lower divisions.
 Cypriot Cup (Northern Cyprus) - a national football tournament in Northern Cyprus.